"I Still Believe in Love" is a single by American country music artist Jan Howard. Released in July 1968, the song reached #28 on the Billboard Hot Country Singles chart. The single was later released on Howard's 1969 self-titled album. The song was written by fellow country artist, Bill Anderson. The song became a major hit in Canada, peaking at #8 on the RPM Country Tracks chart, her first single to chart in Canada.

Chart performance

References 

1968 singles
Jan Howard songs
Songs written by Bill Anderson (singer)
Song recordings produced by Owen Bradley
1968 songs
Decca Records singles